Daniel S. Fisher (born November 21, 1956) is an American theoretical physicist working in statistical physics.

Biography 
Daniel Fisher graduated from Cornell University with a bachelor's degree in mathematics and physics in 1975 and from Harvard University with a master's degree in physics in 1978 and a doctorate in physics in 1979 working with Bertrand Halperin. He then worked in the theoretical department at Bell Labs until 1987. In 1987 he became a professor of physics at Princeton University and in 1990 at Harvard. In 2005 he moved to Stanford University as a professor of applied physics.

Fisher initially focused on dynamics and phase transitions in disordered systems (such as glasses) and quantum dissipation in superconductors. More recently, he switched to biophysics with a wide range of research topics (including information processing in the brain, physics of biological macromolecules, and evolutionary and population dynamics).

He has been a Fellow of the American Physical Society since 1986. He was a Sloan Research Fellow from 1988 to 1992. He was elected to the American Academy of Arts and Sciences in 1999 and the National Academy of Sciences in 2015. He received the Lars Onsager Prize in 2013.

He is a son of  Michael E. Fisher and brother of Matthew P. A. Fisher.

Selected works

External links 
 Homepage (Stanford)
 Math Genealogy
 American Physical Society
 
 German Wikipedia

References 

1956 births
Living people
American physicists
Members of the United States National Academy of Sciences
Fellows of the American Academy of Arts and Sciences
Fellows of the American Physical Society
Stanford University faculty
Princeton University faculty
20th-century physicists
Cornell University alumni
Harvard Graduate School of Arts and Sciences alumni